Henry Bennett Tate (December 3, 1901 – October 27, 1973) was a catcher in Major League Baseball for the Washington Senators (1924–30), Chicago White Sox (1930–32), Boston Red Sox (1932) and Chicago Cubs (1934).

He helped the Senators win the 1924 World Series and the  American League pennant.

Tate was born in Whitwell, Tennessee.  In 10 seasons he played in 566 games and had 1,560 at bats, 144 runs, 435 hits, 68 doubles, 16 triples, 4 home runs, 173 RBI, 5 stolen bases, 118 walks, .279 batting average, .330 on-base percentage, .351 slugging percentage, 547 total bases and 34 sacrifice hits. Defensively, he recorded a .974 fielding percentage.

He died in West Frankfort, Illinois, at the age of 71.

Sources

1901 births
1973 deaths
Major League Baseball catchers
Washington Senators (1901–1960) players
Chicago White Sox players
Boston Red Sox players
Chicago Cubs players
St. Louis Browns scouts
Baseball players from Tennessee
People from Whitwell, Tennessee